Susannah McCorkle (January 1, 1946 – May 19, 2001) was an American jazz singer.

Life and career
A native of Berkeley, California, McCorkle studied Italian literature at the University of California at Berkeley before dropping out to move to Europe. She was inspired to become a singer when she heard Billie Holiday sing "I've Got a Right to Sing the Blues". She began her career in the early 1970s by singing at pubs in London with bandleader John Chilton.  She also worked in London with Keith Ingham and Dick Sudhalter and recorded her first two albums, one a tribute to Harry Warren, the other to Johnny Mercer.

After moving back to the U.S. in the 1970s, she sang at the Cookery in Greenwich Village and the Riverboat in Manhattan. Later in her career she sang often at the Algonquin Hotel. 

No More Blues (1989), her first album for Concord Jazz, was recorded with guitarists Emily Remler and Bucky Pizzarelli and pianist Dave Frishberg. Her writing was published in Cosmopolitan, Newsday, New York, and the O. Henry Award Prize Stories.

Stereo Review magazine named How Do You Keep the Music Playing (1985) as the album of the year, while critic Leonard Feather named it vocal album of the year.

A breast cancer survivor, McCorkle suffered for many years from depression. She died by suicide at age 55 by leaping off the balcony of her apartment at 41 West 86th Street in Manhattan. She was alone in her home at the time. The police immediately entered her home after identifying her body and found no evidence of foul play. Suicide was ruled the cause of death.

Discography
 The Music of Harry Warren (Inner City, 1976)
 The Quality of Mercer (Inner City, 1980)
 Over the Rainbow: The Songs of E.Y. 'Yip' Harburg (Inner City,  1981)
 The People That You Never Get to Love (Inner City, 1981)
 Thanks for the Memory: Songs of Leo Robin (Pausa, 1984)
 How Do You Keep the Music Playing? (Pausa, 1985)
 Dream (Pausa, 1987)
 As Time Goes by (CBS/Sony, 1987)
 No More Blues (Concord Jazz, 1989)
 Sabia (Concord Jazz, 1990)
 I'll Take Romance (Concord Jazz, 1992)
 From Bessie to Brazil (Concord Jazz, 1993)
 From Broadway to Bebop (Concord Jazz, 1994)
 Easy to Love: The Songs of Cole Porter (Concord Jazz, 1996)
 Let's Face the Music: The Songs of Irving Berlin (Concord Jazz, 1997)
 Someone to Watch Over Me: The Songs of George Gershwin (Concord Jazz, 1998)
 From Broken Hearts to Blue Skies (Concord Jazz, 1999)
 Hearts and Minds (Concord Jazz, 2000)
 Most Requested Songs  (Concord Jazz, 2001)
 Ballad Essentials (Concord Jazz, 2002)
 The Beginning: 1975 (Challenge, 2002)
 Adeus: The Berlin Concert (Sonorama, 2015)

Biography
Haunted Heart by Linda Dahl (University of Michigan Press, 2006).

References

External links
 Susannah McCorkle Papers, 1946–2001 Music Division, New York Public Library for the Performing Arts
 

1946 births
2001 deaths
2001 suicides
American expatriates in the United Kingdom
American jazz singers
American women jazz singers
Suicides by jumping in New York City
Musicians from Berkeley, California
Concord Records artists
Pausa Records artists
20th-century American singers
20th-century American women singers
Jazz musicians from California